North Plymouth is a census-designated place (CDP) in the town of Plymouth in Plymouth County, Massachusetts, United States. The population was 3,600 at the 2010 census. it is best known as the location of Cordage Park, a small village where the Plymouth Cordage Company was once headquartered. The village is now home to Cordage Commerce Center, a large retail development that consists of offices and stores.

Geography
North Plymouth is located at  (41.971285, -70.686980).

According to the United States Census Bureau, the CDP has a total area of 9.1 km (3.5 mi), of which 3.3 km (1.3 mi) is land and 5.8 km (2.2 mi) (63.71%) is water.

Demographics

As of the census of 2000, there were 3,593 people, 1,506 households, and 884 families residing in the CDP. The population density was 1,092.3/km (2,832.7/mi). There were 1,580 housing units at an average density of 480.3/km (1,245.7/mi). The racial makeup of the CDP was 93.46% White, 1.95% African American, 0.28% Native American, 0.58% Asian, 1.03% from other races, and 2.70% from two or more races. Hispanic or Latino of any race were 1.00% of the population.

There were 1,506 households, out of which 28.8% had children under the age of 18 living with them, 38.2% were married couples living together, 16.3% had a female householder with no husband present, and 41.3% were non-families. 33.7% of all households were made up of individuals, and 18.2% had someone living alone who was 65 years of age or older. The average household size was 2.36 and the average family size was 3.05.

In the CDP, the population was spread out, with 24.5% under the age of 18, 7.6% from 18 to 24, 30.8% from 25 to 44, 19.4% from 45 to 64, and 17.7% who were 65 years of age or older. The median age was 37 years. For every 100 females, there were 87.3 males. For every 100 females age 18 and over, there were 82.6 males.

The median income for a household in the CDP was $35,561, and the median income for a family was $38,380. Males had a median income of $35,372 versus $26,920 for females. The per capita income for the CDP was $17,508. About 11.2% of families and 14.4% of the population were below the poverty line, including 19.3% of those under age 18 and 15.5% of those age 65 or over.

See also
 Neighborhoods in Plymouth, Massachusetts

References

Plymouth, Massachusetts
Neighborhoods in Plymouth, Massachusetts
Census-designated places in Plymouth County, Massachusetts
Census-designated places in Massachusetts